Ha-209 was an Imperial Japanese Navy Ha-201-class submarine. Completed and commissioned in August 1945 only eleven days before hostilities ended in World War II, and was deliberately run aground by her crew that month.

Design and description

At the end of 1944, the Imperial Japanese Navy decided it needed large numbers of high-speed coastal submarines to defend the Japanese Home Islands against an anticipated Allied invasion (named Operation Downfall by the Allies). To meet this requirement, the Ha-201-class submarines were designed as small, fast submarines incorporating many of the same advanced ideas implemented in the German Type XXI and Type XXIII submarines. They were capable of submerged speeds of almost .

The Ha-201 class displaced  surfaced and  submerged. For surface running, the submarines were powered by a single  diesel engine that drove one propeller shaft. When submerged the propeller was driven by a  electric motor. They could reach  on the surface and  submerged. Their armament consisted of two  torpedo tubes with four torpedoes and a single mount for a 7.7-millimeter machine gun.

Construction and commissioning

Ordered as Submarine No. 4919 and attached provisionally to the Sasebo Naval District on 5 May 1945, Ha-209 was laid down on 7 May 1945 by the Sasebo Naval Arsenal at Sasebo, Japan. She was launched on 31 May 1945 and was completed and commissioned on 4 August 1945.

Service history

Upon commissioning, Ha-209 was attached formally to the Sasebo Naval District and assigned to Submarine Division 52. She departed Sasebo on 11 August 1945 bound for Kure and spent the night of 11–12 August 1945 in Imari Bay on the coast of Kyushu. On the morning of 12 August, she got back underway on the next leg of her voyage, waiting off Mutsure Island while her next anchorage in the Moji Bight was swept for mines.

After spending the night of 12–13 August 1945 at Moji, she resumed her voyage on the morning of 13 August. She was on the surface off Hesaki Lighthouse that day when she detonated an acoustic mine. The explosion blew two of her lookouts overboard, started a fire aft and a minor leak in her main ballast tanks, and brought her to a halt. A minesweeper arrived and towed her to Mitsubishi′s  Hikoshima Shipyard at Shimonoseki, where she unloaded the two Type 95 torpedoes she had aboard.

On the morning of 15 August 1945, Ha-209 entered drydock at Hikoshima Shipyard. At 12:00 that day, Emperor Hirohito announced in a radio broadcast that hostilities between Japan and the Allies had ended. On 18 August 1945, Ha-209′s commanding officer requested that she be undocked, and Ha-209′s crew deliberately ran her aground on Ganryū-jima in the Shimonoseki Strait and abandoned her, except for a skeleton crew of nine who remained aboard for a time before also abandoning ship.

Disposal
After a United States Navy inspection team visited Ha-209′s wreck in late September 1945, the U.S. Navy decided to destroy it with explosives. A U.S. Navy demolition team blew it up on 11 November 1945.

The Japanese struck Ha-209 from the Navy list on 30 November 1945. Between August and November 1946, her wreck was salvaged, taken to Hikoshima Shipyard, and scrapped.

Notes

References

 
, History of Pacific War Vol.17 I-Gō Submarines, Gakken (Japan), January 1998, 
Rekishi Gunzō, History of Pacific War Extra, "Perfect guide, The submarines of the Imperial Japanese Forces", Gakken (Japan), March 2005, 
The Maru Special, Japanese Naval Vessels No.43 Japanese Submarines III, Ushio Shobō (Japan), September 1980, Book code 68343-43
The Maru Special, Japanese Naval Vessels No.132 Japanese Submarines I "Revised edition", Ushio Shobō (Japan), February 1988, Book code 68344-36
Ships of the World special issue Vol.37, History of Japanese Submarines, (Japan), August 1993

Ha-201-class submarines
Ships built by Sasebo Naval Arsenal
1945 ships
World War II submarines of Japan
Maritime incidents in August 1945
Shipwrecks of Japan